Dubu, or tofu, is a food made from coagulated soy milk.

Dubu or Tubu may also refer to:

Dubu language, a language in West New Guinea

See also
Dubu-kimchi, a Korean dish